KXPN (1460 AM) is a radio station broadcasting a sports format. Licensed to Kearney, Nebraska, United States, the station serves the Grand Island-Kearney area.  The station is currently owned by Flood Communications Tri-Cities, L.L.C. and features programming from ESPN Radio and Westwood One.

The station launched in December 1956 as KRNY.

References

External links

XPN